Goodbye and Hello is the second album by Tim Buckley, released in August 1967, recorded in Los Angeles, California, in June of the same year.

The album was later re-released on January 22, 2001, in a compilation with debut album Tim Buckley by WEA/Elektra. In 2005 a 180-gram version of the LP was released on the label Four Men With Beards and is being distributed by City Hall Records.

Recording
The album was recorded during June 1967 in Los Angeles, and produced by Jerry Yester and Jac Holzman.

Legacy
Matthew Greenwald in a retrospective review for AllMusic felt that it is "an excellent and revolutionary album that was a quantum leap for both Tim Buckley and the audience".

The album was included in the book 1001 Albums You Must Hear Before You Die.  In 2000, it was voted number 516 in Colin Larkin's All Time Top 1000 Albums.

Track listing
All songs written by Tim Buckley, except where noted.

Side One
"No Man Can Find the War" (Larry Beckett, Buckley) – 2:58
"Carnival Song" – 3:10
"Pleasant Street" – 5:15
"Hallucinations" (Beckett, Buckley) – 4:55
"I Never Asked to Be Your Mountain" – 6:02

Side Two
"Once I Was (song)" – 3:22
"Phantasmagoria in Two" – 3:29
"Knight-Errant" (Beckett, Buckley) – 2:00
"Goodbye and Hello" (Beckett, Buckley) – 8:38
"Morning Glory" (Beckett, Buckley) – 2:52

Personnel
Tim Buckley – Six- and 12-string acoustic guitars, vocals, bottleneck guitar, kalimba, vibraphone
Lee Underwood – lead guitar
John Farsha – guitar
Brian Hartzler – guitar
Jim Fielder – bass guitar
Jimmy Bond – double bass
Don Randi – piano, harmonium, harpsichord
Henry Diltz – harmonica on "Once I Was"
Jerry Yester – piano, organ, harmonium, recording supervisor
Carter C.C. Collins – congas, percussion
Dave Guard – kalimba, tambourine
Eddie Hoh – drums
Jim Gordon - drums
Technical
Jac Holzman - production supervisor
Bruce Botnick - mixing
William S. Harvey - cover, design
David Gates - liner photography 
Guy Webster - photography

References

External links

Goodbye and Hello (Adobe Flash) at Spotify (streamed copy where licensed)

Tim Buckley albums
1967 albums
Albums produced by Jac Holzman
Elektra Records albums
Albums produced by Jerry Yester
Albums recorded at United Western Recorders